Free Me may refer to:

 Free Me (album), by Emma Bunton, 2004
 "Free Me" (Emma Bunton song), 2003
 "Free Me" (Cast song), 1997
 "Free Me" (Joss Stone song), 2009
 "Free Me" (Roger Daltrey song), 1980
 "Free Me" (Sia song), 2017
 "Free Me", a song by Billy Joe Royal from Out of the Shadows, 1990
 "Free Me", a song by Debbie Gibson from Body, Mind, Soul, 1993
 "Free Me", a song by Foo Fighters from In Your Honor, 2005
 "Free Me", a song by Jenny Berggren from My Story, 2010
 "Free Me", a song by Johnny Preston, 1961
 "Free Me", a song by Otis Redding from Love Man, 1969
 "Free Me", a song by Uriah Heep from Innocent Victim, 1977